Priola is a comune (municipality) in the Province of Cuneo in the Italian region Piedmont, located about  southeast of Turin and about  southeast of Cuneo.

Priola borders the following municipalities: Bagnasco, Calizzano, Garessio, and Viola.

References

Cities and towns in Piedmont